Nebojša Stojković (born 2 June 1974) is a former Serbian football player.

Honours
Anzhi Makhachkala
Russian Cup finalist: 2000–01

Pobeda
Macedonian First Football League champion: 2006–07

References

1974 births
Living people
Serbian footballers
FK Dubočica players
Macedonian First Football League players
FK Pobeda players
Serbian expatriate footballers
Expatriate footballers in North Macedonia
FC Anzhi Makhachkala players
Russian Premier League players
Expatriate footballers in Russia
Association football defenders